Simeon "Blind Simmie" Dooley (July 3, 1881 or June 1887 – January 17, 1961) was an American country blues singer and guitarist.

Biography 
Dooley was born in Hartwell, Georgia, United States.

Dooley met Pink Anderson in 1916 and taught him to play guitar. The two played on the street and at parties when Anderson was not traveling with Dr. Kerr's Medicine Show. In 1928, Dooley and Anderson went to Atlanta to record four pieces for Columbia Records. Two were published in the same year ("Papa's 'Bout To Get Mad", and "Gonna Tip Out Tonight"), with the other two ("Every Day In The Week Blues", and "C.C. & O. Blues") issued the following year. The records sold well. Anderson was invited to make further recordings without Dooley, however Anderson refused to be without Dooley.

Dooley died from heart disease in Spartanburg, South Carolina, at the age of 79.

Musical style 
Blind Gary Davis described Dooley, along with Blind Blake and Blind Willie Davis, as one of the biggest pre-war country blues guitarists.

References

External links 
 [ AllMusic page on Simmie Dooley]

1880s births
1961 deaths
American blues guitarists
American male guitarists
American country singer-songwriters
Country blues singers
Columbia Records artists
People from Hartwell, Georgia
Guitarists from Georgia (U.S. state)
20th-century American singers
Country musicians from Georgia (U.S. state)
20th-century American guitarists
20th-century American male musicians
American male singer-songwriters
Singer-songwriters from Georgia (U.S. state)